The Baynes Baronetcy, of Harefield Place in the County of Middlesex, is a title in the Baronetage of the United Kingdom. It was created on 29 June 1801 for Christopher Baynes. He was Major-Commandant of the Uxbridge Gentlemen and Yeomanry Cavalry, which he helped to raise. The title descended from father to son until the death of his great-great-grandson, the fifth Baronet, in 1971. The late Baronet died unmarried and was succeeded by his first cousin, the sixth Baronet. He was the son of Reverend Malcolm Charles Baynes, fourth son of the third Baronet. As of 2012 the title is held by his grandson, the eighth Baronet, who succeeded his father in 2005.

Baynes baronets, of Harefield Place (1801)
Sir Christopher Baynes, 1st Baronet (1755–1837)
Sir William Baynes, 2nd Baronet (1789–1866)
Sir William John Walter Baynes, 3rd Baronet (1820–1897)
Sir Christopher William Baynes, 4th Baronet (1847–1936)
Sir William Edward Colston Baynes, 5th Baronet, MC (1876–1971)
Donald Stuart Baynes (1848–1932), 2nd son of the 3rd Baronet, died without male issue
Roderick Walter Baynes (1852–1944), 3rd son of the 3rd Baronet, died unmarried
Reverend Malcolm Charles Baynes (1853–1941), 4th son of the 3rd Baronet
Lieutenant Colonel Sir Rory Malcolm Stuart Baynes, 6th Baronet (1886–1979), eldest son of Reverend Malcolm Baynes
Lieutenant Colonel Sir John Christopher Malcolm Baynes, 7th Baronet (1928–2005)
Sir Christopher Rory Baynes, 8th Baronet (born 1956)

The heir apparent to the baronetcy is Alasdair William Merriman Baynes (born 1993)

Notes

References
Kidd, Charles, Williamson, David (editors). Debrett's Peerage and Baronetage (1990 edition). New York: St Martin's Press, 1990, 

Baronetcies in the Baronetage of the United Kingdom